A.M. Barbe High School is a 5A public high school located in Lake Charles, Louisiana, United States. The correct pronunciation of the school's name is "barb", rather than "bar-bay" or "barb-ee". The students are offered a variety of Advanced Placement courses as well as opportunities for dual enrollment in classes within the school and at McNeese State University in Lake Charles, Louisiana. The school holds the title as having the largest enrollment in Advanced Placement courses in the entire State of Louisiana as well as having the highest scores on the exams. As of June, 2019, the Principal is Patrick Fontenot. Barbe is in Calcasieu Parish Public Schools.

History
Barbe High School first opened its doors on September 1, 1971. Construction continued throughout the first semester and was not completed until December. The first graduation ceremony was held in May 1973, with 260 graduates. At that time the school colors of blue and white were chosen and the Buccaneer was chosen as the mascot.
The school, modeled after a junior college, consists of twelve permanent buildings that were originally constructed with the open classroom concept in mind. In 1980 Barbe added a science and art building as well as a new gym. Since then two new pod buildings, a new Stadium, and a Science and Business Building have been added, and the entire school has been completely renovated. The library and media building forms the center of the school, reflecting the importance of learning as the center of the schools philosophy.

Clubs
Clubs at Barbe High: Band, Choir, Show Choir, 4-H, Book club, Chess, cal-cam, FBLA, FCCLA, FCA, Interact, International Club, Junior State, Key club, Mu Alpha Theta Math Club, National Honor Society, National Art Honor Society, SADD, Speech/Debate, Student Council, Art Club (Formerly YACA), American Sign Language(ASL) Club, Yearbook, Psychology club, Green Bucs, Muslim Student Association, Chemistry Club, Fishing Club, LIFE Club, BETA Club, SWAG Team, and Bible Study Club, Spanish Club, Drama Club, Robotics, and Poetry Club

Athletics

Barbe High athletics competes in the LHSAA.

Barbe High School athletes participate in baseball, football and bowling and are the sports for which the school is best known. Barbe's other athletic teams include Color Guard, track, swimming, cheerleading, Bluebelles, soccer, volleyball, basketball (girls and boys), softball, Golf, Bowling, Rodeo, tennis and cross country.

Championships
The Barbe bowling team has won the state championship in 2008, 2010 and 2011.

The Barbe baseball team has won the state championship in 1998, 2000, 2001, 2006, and 2008, 2012, 2014, and 2015. They have also won the NIKE SPARQ national championship challenge. In 2014, they were National Champions. The baseball team has produced six 5A State MVP's. For the 2013–2014 school year, the Barbe baseball team was ranked number 1 in the U.S.

The football team went 9-3 the 2010 season. In 2012, they reached the State Championship Game in New Orleans, but lost to Rummel High School. They have won district and have made the playoffs almost every year.

Notable alumni
Garin Cecchini, Class of 2010, professional baseball player
Gavin Cecchini, Class of 2012, professional baseball player. Played in 2006 Little League World Series
Joe Lawrence, Class of 1996, professional baseball player
Wade LeBlanc, professional baseball player
Josh Prince, professional baseball player
Trey Quinn, professional football player
Justin Vincent, Class of 2003, MVP of the 2004 Sugar Bowl

References

External links
 Official site

Public high schools in Louisiana
Buildings and structures in Lake Charles, Louisiana
Schools in Calcasieu Parish, Louisiana
Educational institutions established in 1971
1971 establishments in Louisiana